is a compilation of arcade games released by Capcom for the PlayStation 2 and Xbox on September 27, 2005 in North America and in 2006 in Japan. It was developed by Digital Eclipse Software (then Backbone Entertainment), Sensory Sweep, and its Japanese developer Klein Computer Entertainment. A second volume, Capcom Classics Collection Vol. 2, was released on November 24, 2006 in North America, for PlayStation 2 and Xbox. The second volume as well as the Xbox version of the first volume were not released in Japan.

Two handheld compilations, Capcom Classics Collection Remixed (not released in Japan) and Capcom Classics Collection Reloaded (Capcom Classics Collection in Japan) were released on March 22 and October 24, 2006 respectively on the PlayStation Portable. Reloaded can also be played on the PlayStation Vita by downloading it on a PS3 and copying it via the USB transfer function to the Vita. A Game Boy Advance compilation, Capcom Classics Mini-Mix (North America only), was released on September 19, 2006. Reloaded and Mini-Mix were not developed by Digital Eclipse, but rather by Klein Computer Entertainment and Sensory Sweep, respectively.

Many of the games included in this compilation were re-released as part of Capcom Arcade Cabinet for PlayStation 3 and Xbox 360 from February 19, 2013 to April 17, 2013.

Overview
In 1998, Capcom produced a series of five video game compilations titled Capcom Generations for the PlayStation and Sega Saturn, released in Japan and the PAL region. The series as a whole compiled over 15 arcade games and the Super NES game Super Ghouls 'n Ghosts. Each volume was accompanied by extra features such as a historical overview of each title, artwork gallery, hints and even cast profiles. All games in these compilations also contained enhanced gameplay options such as rapid fire, a bigger screen, and remixed soundtrack.

Volume 1 of Capcom Classics Collection contains all sixteen games from Capcom Generations and Street Fighter Collection 2 respectively (converted from these ports rather than the arcade originals) and six added emulated titles, while Volume 2 features only titles not included in the Capcom Generations series. As with the Capcom Generations titles, all games contain extra features, which consist of gameplay tips, artwork, listenable music and cast profiles, although the contents are not identical. All the extra features are typically unlocked by getting high scores or achieving unusual gameplay objectives, such as collecting the Yashichi item in several games or picking up Edi. E's gum in Final Fight. High scores can be saved for all the games for three different difficulty settings: Normal, Hardcore (in which only the minimum number of lives and continues are available and the AI is at its best), or Custom (if the player changes the options from the Normal or Hardcore settings).

The home console volumes feature one bonus game each. The first volume features a "Deluxe Versus Mode" for the Street Fighter II games which allows two players to compete against each other by offering the players a selection of characters from all three installments of the Street Fighter II series included in the compilation. This game mode was originally from the Street Fighter Collection 2 compilation for the PlayStation and Saturn, which are the versions emulated in Capcom Classics Collection and Reloaded. Remixed and Volume 2 contain a version of Quiz and Dragons that is exclusively composed of Capcom-related questions.

Lineup by volume

Volume 1

Volume 2

Portable versions 
Remixed and Reloaded, both for the PSP contain mostly the same lineup of games from the two home console volumes. Reloaded contains the 16 games respectively from the Capcom Generations and Street Fighter Collection 2 lineup plus Knights of the Round, Eco Fighters and The King of Dragons while Remixed, which came out before Reloaded, contains the majority of remaining games from the home console versions of Vol. 1 and 2. Super Street Fighter II Turbo, Tiger Road, and Trojan do not appear in the portable versions.

Capcom Classics Collection Remixed

Capcom Classics Collection Reloaded

Capcom Classics Mini Mix 
Capcom Classics Mini Mix is a compilation for the Game Boy Advance that was developed by Sensory Sweep and released around the same time as the home console and PSP versions.

This GBA compilation includes three games originally released for the Nintendo Entertainment System:
 Strider
 Bionic Commando
 Mighty Final Fight

Other collections 
 Capcom Generations
 Capcom Puzzle World
 Capcom Arcade Cabinet

References 

2005 video games
Capcom franchises
Capcom video game compilations
Game Boy Advance games
PlayStation 2 games
PlayStation Portable games
Video games developed in the United States
Xbox games
Video games developed in Japan
Multiplayer and single-player video games